The 6209/6210 Harbin-Suihua Through Train (Chinese:6209/6210次哈尔滨到绥化普通旅客列车) is a Chinese passenger train service running between Harbin to Suihua express passenger trains by the Harbin Railway Bureau, Harbin passenger segment responsible for passenger transport task, Habin originating on the Suihua train. 25B Type Passenger trains running along the Binbei Railway across Heilongjiang provinces, the entire 125 km. Harbin Railway Station to Suihua Railway Station running 2 hours and 39 minutes, use trips for 6209; Suihua Railway Station to Harbin Railway Station to run 3 hours and 19 minutes, use trips for 6210.

See also 
K7031/7032 Harbin-Suihua Through Train

References 

Passenger rail transport in China
Rail transport in Heilongjiang